In economics, dichotomous preferences (DP) are preference relations that divide the set of alternatives to two subsets: "Good" versus "Bad".

From ordinal utility perspective, DP means that for every two alternatives :

From cardinal utility perspective, DP means that for each agent, there are two utility levels: low and high, and for every alternative :

A common way to let people express dichotomous preferences is using approval ballots, in which each voter can either "approve" or "reject" each alternative.

In fair item assignment 
In the context of fair item assignment, DP can be represented by a mathematical logic formula: for every agent, there is a formula that describes his desired bundles. An agent is satisfied if-and-only-if he receives a bundle that satisfies the formula.

A special case of DP is single-mindedness. A single-minded agent wants a very specific bundle; he is happy if-and-only-if he receives this bundle, or any bundle that contains it. Such preferences appear in real-life, for example, in the problem of allocating classrooms to schools: each school i needs a number di of classes; the school has utility 1 if it gets all di classes in the same place and 0 otherwise.

Collective choice under DP

Without money 
Suppose a mechanism selects a lottery over outcomes. The utility of each agent, under this mechanism, is the probability that one of his Good outcomes is selected.

The utilitarian mechanism averages over outcomes with largest “approval”. It is Pareto efficient, strategyproof, anonymous and neutral. 

It is impossible to attain these properties in addition to proportionality - giving each agent a utility of at least 1/n; or at least the fraction of good to feasible outcomes.  conjecture that no ex ante efficient and strategyproof mechanism guarantees a strictly positive utility to all agents, and prove a weaker statement.

With money 
Suppose all agents have DP cardinal utility, where each agent is characterized by a single number -  (so that ). 

 identify a new condition, generation monotonicity, that is necessary and sufficient for implementation by a truthful mechanisms in any dichotomous domain (see Monotonicity (mechanism design)).

If such a domain satisfies a richness condition, then a weaker version of generation monotonicity, 2-generation monotonicity (equivalent to 3-cycle monotonicity), is necessary and sufficient for implementation. 

This result can be used to derive the optimal mechanism in a one-sided matching problem with agents who have dichotomous types

References 

Utility function types